The 1997 National Summer Soccer League was the second season of a short-lived nationwide association football club competition in New Zealand. Despite being known as the 1997 league, competition started in November 1996, with the later rounds and final playoffs held in 1997. The competition was won by Waitakere City.

Structure
The league was an invitation-only competition, with no promotion or relegation taking place. Matches took place between November 1996 and April 1997, with a three-week break from late December to mid-January. The competition was divided into two stages. In the first stage the ten teams took part in a round-robin league, with each team playing every other team home and away. 1996 participants Waikato United were replaced by new team Melville United, which had been formed from a merger of Waikato United and Melville AFC.

The top four teams from this stage progressed to a play-off series. This involved the top two teams from the league phase playing each other, and third and fourth place also playing each other. The winner of the match between first and second progressed through to the final; the loser of that match met the winner of the other match to decide the other finalist.

A unique system of awarding points was used for this competition. Teams were awarded four points for a win and one for a draw. In drawn matches, a penalty shoot-out (minimum of three shots per side) would then take place, with the winning side awarded a bonus point. This system was abandoned at the end of the season; the 1998 league was played using the traditional system of three points for a win, one for a draw, and none for a loss, with no penalty shoot-outs.

League stage

League table

Finals

Playoffs

Final

Records and statistics
 Top scorers
Tim Stevens (North Shore United), 14 goals
Mark Elrick (Central United), 13 goals
Martin Akers  (Napier City Rovers), 12 goals
Justin Fashanu (Miramar Rangers), 12 goals
Stephen Mack (Central United), 12 goals

Biggest winning margin
Waitakere City 8, Wellington United 1

Highest aggregate score
Miramar Rangers 3, Central United 7

References

National Summer Soccer League seasons
1996 in New Zealand association football
1997 in New Zealand association football
New Zealand
New Zealand